Rangapuram Khandrika (or Agraharam) is an agency village in Sitanagaram Gram panchayat of Chintalapudi mandal in Eluru district of Andhra Pradesh.

Villages in Eluru district